Marko Popović (born October 10, 1985) is a Montenegrin professional basketball player for KK Zlatorog Laško of the Premier A Slovenian Basketball League.

References

External links
Marko Popović at aba-liga.com
Marko Popović at eurobasket.com

1985 births
Living people
Sportspeople from Podgorica
ABA League players
BC Cherkaski Mavpy players
KK Budućnost players
Montenegrin men's basketball players
Shooting guards